Zakir Khan (born 3 April 1963) is a Pakistani cricket administrator and former cricketer who played in two Test matches and 17 One Day Internationals from 1984 to 1990. 

He was a fast bowler.

Cricket administration
After retiring from cricket he has assumed different positions within the Pakistan Cricket Board, including being the general manager of the PCB as of 2003, the PCB's director of cricket operations as of 2008, director of domestic cricket as of 2011 and director cricket operations international as of 2021.

References

External links
 

1963 births
Living people
Pashtun people
Pakistani cricket administrators
Pakistan Test cricketers
Pakistan One Day International cricketers
Pakistani cricketers
Peshawar cricketers
Zarai Taraqiati Bank Limited cricketers
North Zone (Pakistan) cricketers
Pakistan Starlets cricketers
People from Bannu District